Urmilesh Shankhdhar (July 6, 1951 – May 16, 2005) was an Indian Hindi-language poet, writer and lyricist. He was one of the popular poets of contemporary Hindi literature. He was awarded Yash Bharti, the highest award of the Government of Uttar Pradesh, posthumously in 2007. Shankhdhar was a professor of Hindi department in Nehru Memorial Shivnarayan Das Memorial College, Budaun.

Biography 
He was born on July 6, 1951, in Islamnagar of Badaun district, India. His native place is Bhatri Govardhanpur village of Budaun district. He was the son of poet Pandit Bhoopram Sharma "Bhoop". He was a gold medalist from Agra University in M.A. Hindi. He completed his B.A. from SM College, Chandauli. He holds a Ph.D. from Agra College, Agra.

In August 1972, Shankhdhar was appointed as a professor in the Hindi Department of NMSN Das College in Budaun. Later, he became president of the Readers and Hindi department.

Some of his published notable works include Dr. Urmilesh Ki Ghazale, Faisala Vah Bhi Galat Tha, Dhoop Nikalegi, Sot Nadi Bahti Hai, Chiranjeev Hain Hum, Jagaran Ki Dehri Par, Bimb Kuchh Ubharte Hain, Ghar Bunte Akshar, Vardanon Ki Pandulipi, Gandho Ki Jaagir, Aaina Aah Bharte Hai and Akshat Yugmaan Ke Sareekhe. His poetry collection, Sot Nadi Bahti Hai, was awarded by the Uttar Pradesh Hindi Sansthan.

He founded Budaun Mahotsav, a cultural fest organized in Budaun, Uttar Pradesh. He founded many literary organizations such as Manch, Anchala, Yuvjan, Kavita Chali Gaanv Ki Or. Dr. Urmilesh received various honorary titles such as Geet Gandharva, Kavi Bhushan, Rashtra Kavi (National Poet), Bharat Shree, Loktantrik Geetkar (Democratic poet), Sahitya Saraswat, Acharyashree and Yugacharan. He made his significant contribution to the environment, literacy, national unity, and Polio eradication.

Selected works 
 Dr. Urmilesh Ki Ghazale
 Pahchaan Aur Parakh
 Faisala Vah Bhi Galat Tha
 Dhoop Nikalegi
 Sot Nadi Bahti Hai
 Chiranjeev Hain Hum
 Baadh Me Doobi Nadi
 Dhuan Cheerte Hue 
 Jagaran Ki Dehri Par
 Bimb Kuchh Ubharte Hain
 Ghar Bunte Akshar
 Vardano Ki Pandulipi
 Gandho Ki Jaagir
 Aaina Aah Bharte Hai
 Akshat Yugmaan Ke Sareekhe

Cassettes 

 Dr. Urmilesh Cassettes (by Vinay Cassette, Neemuch)
 Dr. Urmilesh Ke Geet (by Vishnu Saxena)
 Aapka Saath (by Sonroopa Vishal)
 Dharohar Ki Shabdanjali (by Shivoham Sahityik Manch)
 Vande Mataram (by Vinay Cassette)
 Zindagi Se Jung (by Manjul Cassettes, Budaun)
 Swaranjali (by Sharma Bandhu)

Awards 
 Yash Bharti Award - highest Award of Uttar Pradesh Government, 2007
 Late Ramji Sharan Saxena Award, by Parikrama, Bareilly, 1989
 Bharati Award, by the Madhya Pradesh Sahitya Kala Parishad, Sarguja, 1990
 Nazir-Nirala Hindi Kavita Award, by Lokamangal, Agra, 1992  
 Dinkar Sahitya Award, by the Akhil Bharatiya Sahitya Parishad, Rajasthan, 1992 
 Rashtriya Aatma Puraskar, by the Mahakavi Rashtriya Aatma Smarak Samiti, Kanpur, 1994
 Premchand Lekhak Puraskar, by the Maharashtra Dalit Sahitya Academy, 1999

Death 
He died of a brain hemorrhage on May 16, 2005. With the special direction of then Chief Minister of UP, Mulayam Singh Yadav, he was cremated on the bank of river Ganga in Kachhla with state honour.

Legacy 
A public library named Dr. Urmillesh Smriti Pustakalaya has been set up at the Budaun railway station by  the Indian Railways, Government of India, is dedicated to him. It was established in 2011 by NorthEastern Railway.

In March 2020, Rail Pragya, a magazine of Indian Railways, published by the Department of Official Language, Ministry of Home Affairs, released a special issue in memory of Dr. Urmilesh.

References 

1951 births
2005 deaths
Hindi-language writers
Hindi-language poets
People from Budaun district
20th-century Indian poets
Poets from Uttar Pradesh
Indian male poets
20th-century Indian male writers